Margarita Gasparyan and Ekaterina Makarova were the defending champions, but Gasparyan chose not to defend her title. Makarova retired from professional tennis in January 2020.

Shuko Aoyama and Ena Shibahara won the title, defeating Kaitlyn Christian and Alexa Guarachi in the final, 4–6, 6–0, [10–3].

Seeds

Draw

Draw

References

External links
Main Draw

St. Petersburg Ladies' Trophy - Doubles
St. Petersburg Ladies' Trophy